Elizabeth Warren (born 1949) is an American attorney, professor and politician.

Elizabeth Warren may also refer to:
 Betty Ford (previously Elizabeth Warren; 1918–2011), First Lady of the United States
 Elizabeth Andrew Warren (1786–1864), British botanist
 Elizabeth von Till Warren (born 1934), American historian and preservationist
 Myrtle Elizabeth Warren, fictional character from Harry Potter

See also
 Elizabeth Farren (c. 1759–1829), Irish actress
 Elizabeth Warden (disambiguation)
 Warren (name)